A container is any receptacle or enclosure for holding a product used in storage, packaging, and shipping.

Container may also refer to:

Computing
 Container (abstract data type), a class or data structure that is a collection of other objects
 Container (type theory), abstractions that represent collection types in a uniform way
 Container (virtualization), a server virtualization method
 Container format (computing), for storing related data together, such as audio and video data

Other uses
 Container (board game), a 2007 economic-simulation game
 Container (film), a 2006 Swedish film by Lukas Moodysson
 Container (flowers), plants grown exclusively in containers
 "Container" (song), by Fiona Apple
 Container radar, a Russian over-the-horizon radar system

 Shipping container, for shipping 
 Intermodal container, a large standardized shipping container

See also
 Container Bob, nickname for the man found in a shipping container in 2001
 Enclosure (disambiguation)
 Receptacle (disambiguation)